Churidars, also churidar pyjamas, are tightly fitting trousers worn by both men and women in Indian Subcontinent. Churidars are a variant of the common shalwar pants. Shalwars are cut wide at the top and narrow at the ankle. Churidars narrow more quickly so that contours of the legs are revealed.  They are usually cut on the bias, making them naturally stretchy. Stretch is important when pants are closefitting. They are also longer than the leg and sometimes finish with a tightly fitting buttoned cuff at the ankle. The excess length falls into folds and appears like a set of bangles resting on the ankle (hence 'churidar'; 'churi': bangle, 'dar': like). When the wearer is sitting, the extra material is the "ease" that makes it possible to bend the legs and sit comfortably.  The word churidar is from Urdu and Hindi which made its way into English only in the 20th century. Earlier, tight-fitting churidar-like pants worn in India were referred to by the British as Moghul breeches, long-drawers, or mosquito drawers.<ref name=hobson-jobson>Yule, Henry and A. C. Burnell.  1903.  Hobson-Jobson: A Glossary of Colloquial Anglo-Indian Words and Phrases, and of Kindred Terms, Etymological, Historical, Geographical and Discursive.  London: John Murray.  1021 pages.</ref>

Churidars are usually worn with a kameez (tunic) by women or a kurta'' (a loose overshirt) by men, or they can form part of a bodice and skirt ensemble.

Gallery

See also
 Shalwar kameez
 Jammu dress
 Kandura

References

Indian clothing
Bangladeshi clothing
Pakistani clothing
Hosiery
Trousers and shorts